All India Rajakulathor Peravai is a political party in the Indian state of Tamil Nadu.The party formed to gain votes in Rajakulathor.

Origins and platform 

This assembly originated in Chennai and the first meeting of state administrators in Trichy district was well attended by nearly Thousand people,the founder,who is a High Court advocate,is the former State Students' Deputy Secretary of the Dravida Munnetra Kazhagamand is close to former Member of Parliament T. K. S. Elangovan.

References 

State political parties in Tamil Nadu
2021 establishments in Tamil Nadu
Political parties established in 2021